Sir Akhlaq Ur-Rahman Choudhury (born 23 April 1967) is a British High Court judge of England and Wales. In 2017, he was made Knight Bachelor on appointment, becoming the first British-Bangladeshi and Muslim to be appointed to the High Court of Justice.

Early life
Choudhury was born in Winchester, Hampshire, England to a Bengali Muslim family. When he was four years old, his family moved to Scotland where he grew up in Bishopbriggs on the outskirts of Glasgow.

Choudhury's Sylheti parents had migrated to the United Kingdom before the Bangladesh Liberation War from Zakiganj, Sylhet District, in erstwhile East Pakistan. In the UK, Choudhury's father ran a restaurant business.

Choudhury attended Balmuildy Primary and then Bishopbriggs High School for five years. In 1988, he graduated from University of Glasgow with a BSc degree in physics. In 1991, he graduated from School of Oriental and African Studies, University of London with a first-class honours LLB.

Career
In 1992, Choudhury moved to London, he was called to the Bar (Inner Temple) and started practising as a barrister at 11 King's Bench Walk Chambers (now known as 11 KBW).

Between 1999 and 2005, Choudhury was a member of the Attorney General's panel of approved counsel in which capacity he acted for and advised the Foreign and Commonwealth Office, the Ministry of Defence, HM Revenue and Customs and other Government departments. Between 2009 and 2011, he was a committee member of the Employment Law Bar Association. He was one of the standing counsel for the Information Commissioner's Office.

In 2009, Choudhury was appointed as a recorder on the South East Circuit. In 2015, he was appointed Queen's Counsel. In 2016, he was appointed as a deputy High Court Judge.

In August 2017, Choudhury was one of the five new appointees as judges of the High Court of Justice, effective from 2 October. He was the first British person of Bangladeshi origin and Muslim faith to have been appointed as a Justice of the High Court of England and Wales and was assigned to the Queen's Bench Division by the Lord Chief Justice of England and Wales. Choudhury is among two Bangladesh-origin Queen's Counsel. On 20 December 2018, Choudhury was appointed as the President of the Employment Appeal Tribunal with effect from 1 January 2019.

Choudhury was a member of the Attorney General's A-panel of counsel and advised the Foreign and Commonwealth Office, the Ministry of Defence, HM Revenue and Customs and various other government departments. He was retained as counsel for the Information Commissioner and appeared in cases in the area of freedom of information and data protection law.

Awards and recognition
In October 2017, Choudhury was appointed Knight Bachelor in 2017 Special Honours for members of the judiciary.

Personal life
Choudhury lives in Northwood, London, with his wife, Safina, and their three children.

See also
British Bangladeshi
List of British Bangladeshis

References

External links
11KBW website
Akhlaq Choudhury on Chambers and Partners
Akhlaq Choudhury on Legal 500
Akhlaq Choudhury on Legal Hub
Akhlaq Choudhury on Martindale

1967 births
Living people
English Muslims
English people of Bangladeshi descent
English barristers
21st-century English judges
English King's Counsel
People from Winchester
Lawyers from Glasgow
People from Zakiganj Upazila
People educated at Bishopbriggs High School
Alumni of the University of Glasgow
Alumni of SOAS University of London
Knights Bachelor